Croall is a surname. Notable people with the surname include:

Aston Croall (born 1984), British rugby union player
Heather Croall, Australian-British festival director and documentary producer
Jason Croall (born 1968), Australian rules footballer
Jonathan Croall (born 1941), British author and journalist